Luis María Delgado (1926–2007) was a Spanish film director and screenwriter. He was the son of the director Fernando Delgado.

Selected filmography
 Love and Desire (1952)
 That Man from Tangier (1953)
 Manicomio (1954)
 La estrella del rey (1957)
 The Italians They Are Crazy (1958)
 Diferente (1961)
 Secuestro en la ciudad (1965)
 Mi marido y sus complejos (1969)
 Hamelín (1969)
 Mónica Stop (1969)
 Aventura en las islas Cíes (1972)
 Memorias de un visitador médico (1980)

References

Bibliography
 Labanyi, Jo & Pavlović, Tatjana. A Companion to Spanish Cinema. John Wiley & Sons, 2012.
 Mira, Alberto. The Cinema of Spain and Portugal. Wallflower Press, 2005.

External links

1926 births
2007 deaths
Spanish film directors
Spanish male screenwriters
People from Madrid
20th-century Spanish screenwriters
20th-century Spanish male writers